William Sharp may refer to:

Arts and entertainment
 William Sharp (engraver) (1749–1824), English engraver
 William Sharp (lithographer) (1803–1875), English-born lithographer and painter; lived in Boston, Massachusetts
 William Sharp (writer) (1855–1905), Scottish author and poet, pseudonym Fiona MacLeod

Politics
 William Graves Sharp (1859–1922), American congressman (1909–14); Ambassador to France (1914)
 William Sharp (Australian politician) (1844–1929), New South Wales politician

Science
 William Sharp (homeopath) (1805–1896), English early science educator and homeopath
 William Sharp (surgeon) (1729–1810), surgeon to George III and musician
 William Sharp (scientist) (born 1936), American scientist and entrepreneur

Sports
 William Sharp (footballer) (1889–1915), Scottish footballer
 Billy Sharp (born 1986), English footballer
 Will Sharp (born 1986), Nigerian-born English rugby league player
 Bill Sharp (baseball) (born 1950), outfielder in Major League Baseball
 Bill Sharp (footballer) (1915–2006), Australian rules footballer

Other
 Sir William Sharp, 6th Baronet (1729–1780), Scottish soldier of fortune
 William F. Sharp (1885–1947), American World War II general

See also
 Michael William Sharp (1776–1840), English painter
 William Sharp Bush (1786–1812), U.S. marine
 William Sharp Macleay (1792–1865), British entomologist
 William Sharp McKechnie (1863–1930), Scottish lecturer and author
 William Sharpe (disambiguation)